Talking Point (Nuqtat Hewar) is a TV and Radio phone-in program broadcast on BBC Arabic Service. It was launched on March 26, 2003. The first edition of Nuqtat Hewar presented listeners' views on the war in Iraq.

The program goes live five days a week. First part is broadcast live on the radio and television from 15:06 till 15:57 GMT. The second part is broadcast only on the radio from 16:06 till 16:30 GMT time.

Talking Point reaches its audience through various number of communication channels. The program has a Facebook fan page and a Twitter account.

Current presenters
 Samir Farah
 Nur Zorgui
 Rasha Qandeel

Previous presenters
 Nahed Najjar
 Liliane Daoud

External links
Talking Point 
BBC Arabic - Talking Point program

Arabic-language television shows
BBC World News shows